Segmon is a locality situated in Grums Municipality, Värmland County, Sweden with 437 inhabitants in 2010.

References 

Populated places in Värmland County
Populated places in Grums Municipality